Leptohyptis is a genus of flowering plants belonging to the family Lamiaceae.

Its native range is Eastern Brazil.

Species:

Leptohyptis calida 
Leptohyptis leptostachys 
Leptohyptis macrostachys 
Leptohyptis pinheiroi 
Leptohyptis siphonantha

References

Lamiaceae
Lamiaceae genera